Confienza was the name of at least two ships of the Italian Navy and may refer to:

 , a  launched in 1889 and scrapped in 1901
 , a  launched in 1920 and sunk in 1940

Italian Navy ship names